Starksia fasciata, the blackbar blenny, is a fish species of labrisomid blenny so far known only from around the Bahamas and Cuba. This species can reach a length of  SL.

References

fasciata
Taxa named by William Harding Longley
Fish described in 1934